The Superliga de Voleibol Masculina, (SVM) is the top level of the Spanish volleyball. The championship was founded in 1983. Formerly known as Campeonato Nacional de División de Honor Masculina, and, since 1983 as the current name. The administration of the league is carried out by the Real Federación Española de Voleibol.

Competition format
9 teams played in a two-round format. Upon completion of regular season, the top four teams play Championship's playoffs, while the bottom team is relegated to Superliga 2.

During regular season, a win by 3–0 or 3–1 means 3 points to winner team, while a 3–2 win, 2 points for winner team & 1 for loser team.

Championship playoffs includes quarterfinals, semifinals and the Final and it's played to best of 3 games.

Champions by season

División de Honor

Superliga Masculina

Titles by team

See also
Copa del Rey de Voleibol
Supercopa de España de Voleibol
Superliga 2 de Voleibol Masculina

References

External links
Real Federación Española de Voleibol

 

 
1ºMale
Spain men1
Volleyball
Sports leagues established in 1965
1965 establishments in Spain
Professional sports leagues in Spain